Naustathmus or Naustathmos was a port-town on the Euxine, in the western part of ancient Pontus, on a salt lake connected with the sea, and 90 stadia to the east of the Halys River. The Tabula Peutingeriana calls it Nautagmus. The Anonymous Periplus places it only 40 stadia east of the mouth of the Halys.

Its site is located in Asiatic Turkey.

References

Populated places in ancient Pontus
Former populated places in Turkey
History of Samsun Province